The Dos Papagaios River ("Rio dos Papagaios") is a river of Paraná state in southern Brazil. The river marks the eastern border of Porto Amazonas municipality.

See also
List of rivers of Paraná

References

External links
Brazilian Ministry of Transport

Rivers of Paraná (state)
Palmeira, Paraná